René Oliva (born 7 March 1987) is a Chilean handball player for Balónmano Ovalle and the Chilean national team.

References

1987 births
Living people
Chilean male handball players
Handball players at the 2011 Pan American Games
Handball players at the 2015 Pan American Games
Pan American Games bronze medalists for Chile
Pan American Games medalists in handball
Medalists at the 2015 Pan American Games
Medalists at the 2011 Pan American Games
20th-century Chilean people
21st-century Chilean people